The SPCA Météore 63 (French for "Meteor") was a flying boat built in France in the 1920s for use as an airliner. It was the first product of the SPCA company (Société Provençale de Constructions Aéronautiques), founded by Laurent-Dominique Santoni when he left CAMS in 1925.

Design
The Météore was a conventional biplane design for its day, with single-bay wings of unequal span braced with struts and wire. The lower wing was mounted to the top of the aircraft's hull, with trusswork above it that carried three engines mounted tractor-fashion in the interplane gap. The lower wing also carried outrigger pontoons near its tips. The empennage was of conventional design, with the stabilizer carried part-way up the fin. The flight deck was open but the separate cabin, with seating for six passengers, was fully enclosed within the hull and electrically heated. The structure was of timber throughout except for the struts that carried the engines, which were steel tube. The wings were covered in fabric.

Operational history
In 1926, SPCA entered a Météore in a competition for transport seaplanes organised by the French Undersecretariat for Aeronautics, the Grand Prix des Hydravions de Transport Multimoteurs (Grand Prize of multi-engine transport seaplanes). Piloted by Ernest Burri, the Météore won first place and a FF 100,000 prize. It was also the first French transport seaplane to which Bureau Veritas awarded a first-class airworthiness certificate. The same year, Lignes Aériennes Latécoère trialled the type on a mail route between Marsailles and Algiers, the first trip taking place on 22 October.

Because of the Météore's long range, Air Union Lignes d’Orient (AULO) ordered an example in January 1927. In October that year, Maurice Noguès flew it from Marsailles to Beirut but crashed and sank off Naples during the return journey. Nevertheless, AULO purchased a second example in May 1928, and with this aircraft inaugurated a regular service between the two cities on 6 June 1929. On 17 February 1931, the Météore also established the Paris–Saigon route for Air Orient, which had been formed by a merger of AULO and Air Asie the previous year. Over its lifespan, the Météore covered .

Operators
 Lignes Aériennes Latécoère
 Air Union Lignes d’Orient

Specifications

See also

Notes

References

 
 
 
 
 
 
 
 

1920s French airliners
Flying boats
SPCA aircraft
Trimotors
Biplanes